The field of Business Process Preservation is concerned with digitally preserving business processes and services to ensure their long-term continued access. Built on feasibility and cost-benefit analysis it analyses and recommends which aspects of a business process should be preserved and how to preserve them. It develops methodologies and tools to capture and formalise business processes on both technical and organisational levels. This includes their underlying software and hardware infrastructures and dependencies on third-party services and information. It aligns digital preservation with well-established methods for enterprise risk management and business continuity management.

Motivation
The commercial imperative for business process preservation comes from several pressures.  Heavily regulated industries, such as pharmaceuticals and aircraft manufacture must fully document processes so that they can be audited, reproduced, or diagnosed. Long-lived companies must manage services across multiple changes in technical environments. Organisations that use escrow services to mitigate risk must be confident that all of the needed information is demonstrably included in the escrow agreement and services. Organisations undergoing major staff changes must ensure that they retain the knowledge needed to operate or re-instate production processes.  In addition to publications and data, academics need the software and process information to assess the validity of the data and the derived scientific claims. The same provenance information that can provide a key in regulated industries can also support credit assignment in academia. All industries benefit from analysis of processes that may lead to their continuous improvement. Memory institutions need to document the provenance of their digital collections as they undergo format-shifts to prove the authenticity or quality of their process products.

Approach
The approach used by the EU co-funded TIMBUS project  breaks business process preservation down into three functions:
 Planning: performs risk analysis and determines the requirements for preserving the relevant business processes.
 Preservation: preserves the business processes.
 Redeployment: reactivates and reruns the business processes.

References

External links 
 Orit Edelstein, Michael Factor, Ross King, Thomas Risse, Eliot Salant and Philip Taylor. Evolving Domains, Problems and Solutions for Long Term Digital Preservation, iPres 2011, Singapore, 1–4 November 2011
  Rudolf Mayer, Andreas Rauber, Martin Alexander Neumann, John Thomson, and Goncalo Antunes Preserving Scientific Processes from Design to Publications, Theory and Practice of Digital Libraries (TPDL) 2012, www.tpdl2012.org/, 23–27 September 2012, Paphos, Cyprus
 Angela Dappert. Metadata for Preserving Computing Environments. POCOS Symposium on Gaming Environments & Virtual Worlds, 26 January 2012, Cardiff, Wales, UK

Business process management